Making the Varsity is a 1928 American silent drama film directed by Cliff Wheeler and starring Rex Lease, Arthur Rankin, and Gladys Hulette.

Cast
 Rex Lease as Ed Ellsworth 
 Arthur Rankin as Wall Ellsworth 
 Gladys Hulette as Estelle Carter 
 Edith Murgatroyd as Mrs. Ellsworth 
 Florence Dudley as Gladys Fogarty 
 Carl Miller as Jerry Fogarty 
 James Latta as Gridley

References

Bibliography
 Munden, Kenneth White. The American Film Institute Catalog of Motion Pictures Produced in the United States, Part 1. University of California Press, 1997.

External links

1928 films
1928 drama films
Silent American drama films
Films directed by Cliff Wheeler
American silent feature films
1920s English-language films
American black-and-white films
1920s American films
English-language drama films